Li Xuanxu (born February 5, 1994, in Zhuzhou, Hunan) is a Chinese swimmer, who competed for Team China at the 2008 Summer Olympics. At the 2012 Summer Olympics she qualified in second place in the heats with a time of 4:34.28 in the Women's 400 metre individual medley. She won the Bronze medal in the final with 4:32.91.

Major achievements
2008 National Champions Tournament - 1st 400 m IM

See also 
 China at the 2012 Summer Olympics

References

http://2008teamchina.olympic.cn/index.php/personview/personsen/2462 

1994 births
Living people
Chinese female freestyle swimmers
Chinese female medley swimmers
Olympic swimmers of China
People from Zhuzhou
Swimmers at the 2008 Summer Olympics
Swimmers at the 2012 Summer Olympics
World Aquatics Championships medalists in swimming
Olympic bronze medalists in swimming
Olympic bronze medalists for China
Swimmers from Hunan
Medalists at the FINA World Swimming Championships (25 m)
Asian Games medalists in swimming
Swimmers at the 2010 Asian Games
Medalists at the 2012 Summer Olympics
Asian Games gold medalists for China
Medalists at the 2010 Asian Games
Asian Games silver medalists for China
Universiade medalists in swimming
Universiade silver medalists for China
21st-century Chinese women